William Humble was an English cricketer.

William Humble may also refer to:

William Humble of the Humble Baronets
Bill Humble (1911–1992), British aviator